The following is an alphabetical list of members of the United States House of Representatives from the state of Alabama.  For chronological tables of members of both houses of the United States Congress from the state (through the present day), see United States congressional delegations from Alabama.  The list of names should be complete, but other data may be incomplete.

Current members

: Jerry Carl (R) (2021–present)
: Barry Moore (R) (2021–present)
: Mike D. Rogers (R) (2003–present)
: Robert Aderholt (R) (1997–present)
: Dale Strong (R) (2023–present)
: Gary Palmer (R) (2015–present)
: Terri Sewell (D) (2011–present)

List of members

See also

List of United States senators from Alabama
United States congressional delegations from Alabama
Alabama's congressional districts

References

External links

Alabama
Representatives